Condon State Airport  is a public airport  northeast of the city of Condon in Gilliam County, Oregon.

The airport is also known as Pauling Field, after Nobel laureate Linus Pauling, who lived in Condon during his youth.

External links

Airports in Gilliam County, Oregon